Thomas Jarrell "Jerry" Coody (born October 3, 1931) was a Cherokee-American football player who played for the Calgary Stampeders. He played college football at Baylor University and is a member of the school's athletic hall of fame.

References

1931 births
Living people
Calgary Stampeders players
Canadian football running backs
Baylor Bears football players
American football halfbacks
American players of Canadian football